Vegesela may refer to the following places and jurisdictions in Roman North Africa:

 Vegesela in Byzacena
 Vegesela in Numidia